Carlos Moyà defeated Félix Mantilla 6–0, 6–3 to win the 1995 ATP Buenos Aires singles competition. Àlex Corretja was the defending champion.

Seeds

  Gilbert Schaller (first round)
  Álbert Costa (second round)
  Marcelo Ríos (second round)
  Alberto Berasategui (quarterfinals)
 n/a
  Francisco Clavet (first round)
  Javier Sánchez (second round)
  Bohdan Ulihrach (first round)

Draw

Finals

Top half

Bottom half

External links
 1995 ATP Buenos Aires Singles draw

Singles
ATP